"Without You" is a song written by Pete Ham and Tom Evans of British rock group Badfinger, and first released on their 1970 album No Dice. The power ballad has been recorded by over 180 artists, and versions released as singles by Harry Nilsson (1971), T. G. Sheppard (1983) and Mariah Carey (1994) became international best-sellers. The Nilsson version was included in 2021's Rolling Stones 500 Greatest Songs of All Time. Paul McCartney once described the ballad as "the killer song of all time".

In 1972, writers Ham and Evans received the British Academy's Ivor Novello Award for Best Song Musically and Lyrically.

Badfinger original
First recorded by the rock group Badfinger, the song was composed by two of its members. Pete Ham wrote a song originally titled "If It's Love", but it had lacked a strong chorus. At the time of writing, the band shared residence with the Mojos at 7 Park Avenue in Golders Green. One evening, in the midst of the parties, songwriting, touring, in Golders Green, Ham and his girlfriend Beverly Tucker were about to go out for the evening. But just as they were leaving Tom Evans said he had an idea for a song – Ham said, "Not tonight, I've promised Bev." But she thought he would be wondering if he had done the right thing later, if he went out. She told him, "Go into the studio, I'm fine about it..." He replied, "Your mouth is smiling, but your eyes are sad." The song Ham wrote that night was called "If it's Love" and has the verse "Well I can't forget tomorrow, when I think of all my sorrow, I had you there but then I let you go, and now it's only fair that I should let you know... if it's love". But Ham wasn't happy with the chorus.

Evans' relationship with his future wife Marianne influenced his lyrics:

Both Ham and Evans said they did not consider the song to have much potential at the time Badfinger recorded it, and the track was slotted to close the first side of their 1970 album No Dice. Badfinger's recording of the song, which is more brusque than its successors' versions, was not released as a single in Europe or North America.

The two writers of the song, Ham and Evans, later committed suicide due to legal and financial issues.  In Evans' case, it was a dispute over songwriting royalties for "Without You" that precipitated his action. Songwriting royalties had become the subject of constant legal wrangling for Evans, and in 1983, following an acrimonious argument with his bandmate Joey Molland over the royalties for the song, Evans hanged himself.

Harry Nilsson version

Background

Harry Nilsson, at the time best known for his hit "Everybody's Talkin'" and for composing "One", recorded by Three Dog Night, heard Badfinger's recording of "Without You" at a party, and mistook it for a Beatles song. After realising it was not, he decided to cover the song for his 1971 album Nilsson Schmilsson. The single was released by RCA in the autumn of 1971, and it first charted on radio stations across the US in early December. "Without You" debuted at number 99 on the Billboard Hot 100 on 18 December 1971, and on its tenth week, in the chart dated 19 February 1972, started its four-week run at number one. Billboard ranked it as the number-four single of 1972. The record topped Billboards Easy Listening chart for five weeks.

The record spent five weeks at number one on the UK Singles Chart, beginning on 11 March, eventually selling almost 800,000 copies. It went to number one in several other countries, including Australia (for five weeks), Ireland (two weeks) and New Zealand (two weeks).

The single, Grammy-nominated for Record of the Year, was produced by Richard Perry, who later explained, "It was a different record for its time. It was a big ballad with a heavy backbeat, and although many artists have cut songs like it since, no one was doing it then." Gary Wright, who worked with Badfinger on George Harrison's projects, played the piano. Also featured are Klaus Voormann (bass), Jim Keltner (drums) and John Uribe (acoustic guitar). The string and horn arrangements are by Paul Buckmaster. In 1973, the single won Nilsson the Grammy award for Best Pop Vocal Performance, Male.  While Nilsson rarely gave live concerts, he did perform the song with Ringo Starr and his All-Starr Band at Caesar's Palace in Las Vegas in September 1992.

In 2021, this version was ranked 496th on Rolling Stones 500 Greatest Songs of All Time.

Harry Nilsson track listing
Worldwide Single
 "Without You" – 3:17
 "Gotta Get Up" – 2:24

EP (Portugal)
 "Without You" – 3:17
 "The Moonbeam Song" – 3:18
 "Gotta Get Up" – 2:24
 "Jump Into The Fire" – 3:32

Chart performance

Weekly charts

Year-end charts

All-time charts

Certifications

Personnel
According to the 1971 LP credits:

 Harry Nilsson – vocals
 Gary Wright – piano
 John Uribe – acoustic guitar
 Klaus Voormann – bass guitar
 Jim Keltner – drums
 Paul Buckmaster – string and French horn arrangements

Mariah Carey version

Background
American singer and songwriter Mariah Carey's version, based on Harry Nilsson's version rather than the Badfinger original, was released as the third single off Music Box in the first quarter of 1994, its US release date of 21 January 1994 falling a week after Nilsson had died following a heart attack on 15 January 1994. In the US "Without You" was promoted as a double A-side with "Never Forget You". While she had heard Nilsson's version as a very young girl, Carey's decision to remake his hit was based on a chance hearing during the time she was recording Music Box: "I heard that song in a restaurant and just knew it would be a huge international hit" recalls Carey. Carey's version has been considered very popular on talent shows. "Without You" was later included on some non-US pressings of her compilation albums #1's (1998) and #1 to Infinity (2015), and her 2001 compilation, Greatest Hits. "Without You" was also included on her 2008 compilation The Ballads.

In February 2008, Carey's version was performed in severely broken English on the Bulgarian talent show Music Idol by contestant Valentina Hasan, spawning a global meme called "Ken Lee" (misinterpretation of the line "Can't live").

Release
"Without You" was released on 21 January 1994 in the United States, where Columbia distributed 7-inch vinyls, 12-inch vinyls, cassettes, maxi cassettes, CDs, and maxi CD singles. The label issued it in the United Kingdom on 7 February as a 7-inch vinyl, cassette, and CD. RCA re-released Nilsson's version on the same day. Columbia issued a second UK CD a week later. Sony Music Japan released a mini CD in that country on 21 February.

Chart performance
"Without You" reached number three on the US Billboard Hot 100 for six weeks, remaining in the top 40 for 21 weeks and on the chart for 23. It reached number two on both the Billboard Hot 100 Airplay and Radio & Records pop charts (ending Carey's streak of consecutive number ones on the latter chart; all ten of her previous singles had gone to the top), and number three on the Hot 100 Singles Sales. It was certified platinum by the RIAA and sold 600,000 copies domestically. It was ranked 16 on the Hot 100 1994 year-end charts. In Canada, it peaked at number four.

"Without You" remains Carey's biggest hit across Europe. In the United Kingdom, where Carey had yet to score a number one hit, "Without You" made its UK chart debut at number one where it remained for four weeks in total, and later ended as the 7th best-selling single of 1994 in the United Kingdom. Additionally, Carey achieved a "Chart Double" in the UK, with both "Without You" and the album Music Box holding the top spot at the same time. In the UK, "Without You" was Carey's only number-one solo hit (seven years later, she topped the charts with her collaboration with Westlife: "Against All Odds" in 2000), until Carey scored a second number-one solo hit with "All I Want for Christmas Is You" in 2020. "Without You" was certified platinum in the UK with combined sales and streams of 600,000. It was a runaway success across Europe, in which it topped the European Hot 100 Singles chart for two weeks. "Without You" reached number one for ten weeks in Switzerland; eight weeks in Austria and Sweden; seven weeks in Belgium; five weeks in Ireland and the Netherlands; four weeks in Germany and Iceland; and two weeks in Scotland, where Carey's success had previously been limited. The song also peaked at number two in France and Denmark; at number three in Norway; and at number four in Lithuania. "Without You" was certified platinum in Germany and Austria by IFPI, and gold in France by SNEP.

Being a number-three hit for Carey in Australia, "Without You" topped the charts in New Zealand for one week. It was certified 2× platinum in Australia by ARIA, and gold in New Zealand by RIANZ.

Critical reception

Scottish Aberdeen Press and Journal described the song as "inspirational". Billboard wrote, "Carey offers a faithful rendition of the eternally sweet pop ballad", adding that the "song's arrangement is infused with all the romance and drama it requires, with Carey rising above the mix with a vocal that is more heartfelt and gutsy than note-scaling and acrobatic." Troy J. Augusto from Cash Box named it Pick of the Week, stating that "Carey has thankfully learned the important difference between dynamic control and sonic overkill, never more evident than here. Her recent short concert tour revealed Mariah to be an anxious, under-confident live performer, but this song, with its accompanying tale of her own childhood loneliness made "Without You" the show's climax. Expect a long chart life." 

David Browne of Entertainment Weekly called Carey's cover a "by-the-numbers remake of Nilsson's melodramatic 1972 hit." John Kilgo from The Network Forty concluded that "exhibiting her dynamic vocal range with powerful emotion, Mariah scores again with her rendition of Harry Nilsson's chart topper." A reviewer from People Magazine noted that "she takes on a sensuality—in a lower register—that is often sacrificed for her "look Ma, no hands" vocal fireworks." In an 2015 retrospective review, Pop Rescue stated that "Without You" gives the singer "a ton of space to really let her vocals reach wherever they want to", adding it as "an epic track, and a fantastic showcase of her vocals." Stephen Holden of Rolling Stone called it the "likeliest contender" for ballads like "I Will Always Love You", praising how Carey "dips into her lower register and is accompanied by backup singers (including herself) magnified to sound like a mighty gospel chorus." Mike Joyce from The Washington Post stated, "Unlike Nilsson, Carey has the pipes to pull off this anguished pop aria".

Track listing
 Worldwide CD single
 "Without You" – 3:38
 "Never Forget You" – 3:45

 European maxi-CD single #1
 "Without You" – 3:38
 "Never Forget You" – 3:45
 "Dreamlover (live from Here Is Mariah Carey)" – 4:09

 European maxi-CD single #2
 "Without You" – 3:38
 "Vision of Love" – 3:28
 "I'll Be There" (Featuring Trey Lorenz) – 4:28
 "Love Takes Time" – 3:48

Credits
Credits adapted from the liner notes of Music Box.

Locations

Personnel

Charts

Weekly charts

Year-end charts

Decade-end charts

All-time charts

Certifications and sales

Other versions
 in 1975: Ruby Winters (single/ No. 95 R&B)
 in 1977: Susie Allanson (album A Little Love) (also 1979 single/ No. 77 C&W); Heart (album Magazine)
 in 1983: Herman van Veen (album On Broadway); T. G. Sheppard (album Greatest Hits) (also single/ No. 12 C&W)
 in 1991: Air Supply (album The Earth Is...) (also single/ No. 48 A/C);
 in 1991: "Ohne dich" ("without you") by Frank Schöbel (East Germany)
 in 2008: "Ken Lee" by Valentina Hasan

ASCAP and Ivor Novello recognition

On 15 May 1995, at ASCAP's twelfth annual Pop Music Awards in Beverly Hills, California, "Without You" was recognised as one of the 50 most-played songs of 1994 (due largely to Mariah Carey's recording). Discrepancies in ASCAP's books, resulting from a lawsuit against the Ham and Evans estates by their former manager, incorrectly attributed the song as being composed not only by Ham and Evans, but also by Badfinger's other bandmembers, Mike Gibbins and Joey Molland, and their former manager, Bill Collins. This designation and a lack of correction by ASCAP prompted the Ham Estate to boycott the ceremony. The song was also nominated for "Song of the Year" in London at the Ivor Novello Awards.

See also
 List of Dutch Top 40 number-one singles of 1994
 List of Hot 100 number-one singles of 1972 (U.S.)
 List of number-one adult contemporary singles of 1972 (U.S.)
 List of number-one singles from the 1970s (UK)
 List of number-one hits of 1994 (Austria)
 List of number-one hits of 1994 (Germany)
 List of number-one singles of 1994 (Ireland)
 List of number-one hits of 1994 (Switzerland)
 List of number-one singles from the 1990s (UK)
 List of RPM number-one singles of 1972

References

Sources

External links
 

1970 songs
1971 singles
1994 singles
1970s ballads
Air Supply songs
Badfinger songs
Harry Nilsson songs
Heart (band) songs
Mariah Carey songs
Pandora (musical group) songs
Shirley Bassey songs
T. G. Sheppard songs
Billboard Hot 100 number-one singles
Cashbox number-one singles
Dutch Top 40 number-one singles
European Hot 100 Singles number-one singles
Irish Singles Chart number-one singles
Number-one singles in Germany
Number-one singles in Iceland
Number-one singles in Italy
Number-one singles in Scotland
Number-one singles in Sweden
Number-one singles in Switzerland
UK Singles Chart number-one singles
Grammy Award for Best Male Pop Vocal Performance
Song recordings produced by Buddy Killen
Song recordings produced by Geoff Emerick
Song recordings produced by Mike Flicker
Song recordings produced by Richard Perry
Song recordings produced by Walter Afanasieff
Songs written by Pete Ham
Songs written by Tom Evans (musician)
Songs about loneliness
Rock ballads
Torch songs
Apple Records singles
Columbia Records singles
Curb Records singles
Giant Records (Warner) singles
Mushroom Records singles
RCA Records singles
Sony Music singles
United Artists Records singles
Warner Records singles